Emiliano Gabriel Vecchio (born 16 November 1988) is an Argentine professional footballer who plays for Racing Club de Avellaneda as a midfielder.

Club career

Rosario Central
Born in Rosario, Vecchio began his career at hometown professional club Rosario Central, joining its youth ranks in 1997 at the age of nine. He progressed through the club's youth setup, also being a teammate of Ángel Di María.

On 6 November 2005 Vecchio made his first team debut, coming on as a 77th-minute substitute for Diego Calgaro in a 1–2 away loss against Newell's Old Boys; aged only 16, he became the fourth youngest to debut for the club. He scored his first professional goal on 1 March of the following year, netting the equalizer in a 1–1 home draw against Argentinos Juniors.

Spain
In January 2008, after a failed trial at Real Madrid, Vecchio joined Segunda División B side CF Fuenlabrada. After suffering relegation with the club, he moved to neighbouring CF Rayo Majadahonda, in Tercera División; he left the latter in 2009.

Grêmio Barueri / Defensores de Belgrano
In February 2009, Vecchio signed a one-year deal with Corinthians in March, being immediately loaned to Grêmio Barueri. After being rarely used, his loan was cut short early, and he spent the following six months practicing MMA fight.

In 2010, after returning to his hometown, Vecchio joined Defensores de Belgrano de Villa Ramallo. With the side he scored in an impressive rate, netting a career-best 11 goals in 2011–12.

Chile
In 2012, Vecchio signed for Chile’s Campeonato Nacional side Unión Española to face the Torneo Apertura and the Copa Libertadores. At the team led by José Luis Sierra in the age, he highlighted in both competitions. His first continental goal was against Colombian side Junior, scoring his side’s goal following a nice free kick in a 2–1 away loss. During the season, he scored six goals in 35 appearances and helped Unión to be runner-up of the 2012 Clausura.

On 26 December 2012, it was confirmed that Vecchio alongside his teammate at Unión, Emilio Hernández, were the new signings of Colo-Colo for the 2013 season. After an irregular season for the club, the following year Vecchio was protagonist of the league title obtained, being an undisputed player at Héctor Tapia's formation. On 26 December 2015, he announced his departure after having altercations with the club's president, Anibal Mosa.

Qatar SC / Santos
On 20 January 2016, Vecchio joined Qatar SC, signing a six-month contract. On 10 May, he agreed to a pre-contract with Campeonato Brasileiro Série A club Santos FC, signing a three-and-a-half-year deal on 13 June.

Vecchio made his debut for Peixe on 16 July 2016, coming on as a late substitute for Gabriel in a 3–1 home win against Ponte Preta. After being completely ostracized by Dorival Júnior, he started to feature more regularly under Levir Culpi, and scored his first goal for the club on 19 July 2017 in a 1–0 home win against Chapecoense.

On 14 August 2018, Vecchio was loaned to Shabab Al-Ahli Dubai FC for one year.

Al-Ittihad
On 11 July 2019, Santos announced the transfer of Vecchio to Al-Ittihad Club.

Career statistics

Honours

Club
Colo-Colo
Primera División de Chile (2): 2014 Clausura, 2015 Apertura

Shabab Al-Ahli
 UAE League Cup (2019)
 UAE President Cup (2019)

Individual
El Gráfico Magazine Awards: 2012 Team of the Season
SIFUP Awards: 2013–14 Best Left Midfielder

References

External links

1988 births
Living people
Footballers from Rosario, Santa Fe
Argentine people of Italian descent
Argentine footballers
Association football midfielders
Argentine Primera División players
Torneo Argentino A players
Rosario Central footballers
Defensores de Belgrano footballers
Segunda División B players
CF Fuenlabrada footballers
CF Rayo Majadahonda players
Campeonato Brasileiro Série A players
Chilean Primera División players
Qatar Stars League players
UAE Pro League players
Saudi Professional League players
Bolivian Primera División players
Sport Club Corinthians Paulista players
Grêmio Barueri Futebol players
Santos FC players
Unión Española footballers
Colo-Colo footballers
Qatar SC players
Shabab Al-Ahli Club players
Ittihad FC players
Club Bolívar players
Racing Club de Avellaneda footballers
Argentine expatriate footballers
Argentine expatriate sportspeople in Spain
Argentine expatriate sportspeople in Brazil
Argentine expatriate sportspeople in Chile
Argentine expatriate sportspeople in Qatar
Argentine expatriate sportspeople in the United Arab Emirates
Argentine expatriate sportspeople in Saudi Arabia
Argentine expatriate sportspeople in Bolivia
Expatriate footballers in Spain
Expatriate footballers in Brazil
Expatriate footballers in Chile
Expatriate footballers in Qatar
Expatriate footballers in the United Arab Emirates
Expatriate footballers in Saudi Arabia
Expatriate footballers in Bolivia